Penstemon digitalis (known by the common names foxglove beard-tongue, foxglove beardtongue,  talus slope penstemon, and white beardtongue) is a species of flowering plant in the plantain family, Plantaginaceae. The flowers are white and are borne in summer. It is native to eastern Canada and the eastern and southeastern United States. Penstemon digitalis is the most widespread species of Penstemon east of the Mississippi River.

Description

Penstemon digitalis is a glabrous 3 to 5 foot tall herbaceous plant with opposite, shiny green, simple leaves, on slender, purple stems. The leaves are up to 5 inches long. While upright, the stems average anywhere from 2 to 3 feet tall. The flowering panicle extends to almost one third of the plant's height and has pairs of branches which repeat with two flowers multiple times. The pedicels are almost one fourth of an inch long and produce 1.25 inch long two-lipped tubular flowers over dark green foliage.  The flowers have tiny white hairs on the outside of the tube.  The plant has elliptic basal leaves and lance-shaped to oblong stem leaves.

The species was originally described as "Fox-Glove-Like Pentstemon" (sic) and the specific epithet digitalis is a direct reference to the foxglove genus Digitalis. The plant grows in moist, sandy soil in full sun in meadows, prairies, fields, wood margins, open woods and along railroad tracks. Its bloom period is from late spring to early summer. The plant is known to attract butterflies, bees, and birds such as hummingbirds. It tolerates deer browsing.

Genome size
The genus Penstemon is the largest in North America with 270 species. However, genome size was relatively unknown for the species, which can be important for taxonomy. Scientists estimated the genome size for 40% of the species in the genus using flow cytometry. Penstemon digitalis has one of the largest genomes of the genus Penstemon.

Cultivation
Like other Penstemon species, it is used in roadside planting because it is easily grown and showy. It is recommended for easy use in gardens from the Midwest to the Atlantic coast and Pacific Northwest by the American Penstemon Society. Iowa's Living Roadway Profiler from the Iowa Department of Transportation says that the plant's "decorative seed capsules add interest in the fall and winter".

One of the plant's cultivars is named Husker Red because of its red foliage that has white or bluish-pink flowers. The Perennial Plant Association chose the Husker Red cultivar of Penstemon digitalis as the 1996 Perennial Plant of the Year. The author of the book Perennial All-Stars described Husker Red as "a stunning flowering perennial" and that "you can easily see why the Perennial Plant Association chose this perennial above all others". Husker Red was named after the Nebraska Cornhuskers. The other cultivar, Mystica, is green at first and then later changes to red in the fall.

Penstemon 'Dark Towers' is a hybrid between Penstemon digitalis 'Husker Red' and Penstemon 'Prairie Splendor' (which in turn is a hybrid of Penstemon cobaea and Penstemon triflorus). The hybrid has tubular pink flowers that grow up to 1.5 inches tall, red foliage, and is 1.5 feet to 3 feet tall. Although Dark Towers is similar to Husker Red, its red foliage is darker than that of the Husker Red cultivar and has more height. It also stays red for a longer time in the summer. Dale Lindgren created and named both Husker Red and Dark Towers at the University of Nebraska in 1983. Lindgren decided to create Husker Red because of its purplish-red foliage.

References

digitalis
Flora of Eastern Canada
Flora of the Eastern United States
Flora of the Northeastern United States
Flora of the Southeastern United States
Flora of the Appalachian Mountains
Flora of the Great Lakes region (North America)
Flora of the United States
Flora of Ontario
Plants described in 1825
Flora without expected TNC conservation status